Gholamabad may refer to:
 Gholamabad (32°22′ N 50°22′ E), Kuhrang, Chaharmahal and Bakhtiari Province
 Gholamabad (32°29′ N 50°15′ E), Kuhrang, Chaharmahal and Bakhtiari Province
 Gholamabad, Fars
 Gholamabad, Golestan
 Gholamabad, Ilam
 Gholamabad-e Khayyat, Lorestan Province